Indio is a 1989 Italian action film starring Francesco Quinn and directed by Antonio Margheriti.

Plot Outline
An American Indian and war veteran decides to fight a huge construction company to save his jungle homeland and, at the same time, the amazon rainforest from the destruction.

Cast
 Francesco Quinn as Daniel Morell 
 Marvelous Marvin Hagler as Jake
 Brian Dennehy as Whytaker 
 Rene Abadeza as Tribesman (uncredited)
 Larry Atlas as "Moose" (uncredited) 
 David Brass as Head Guard (uncredited) 
 David Light as Softball Team Member (uncredited)
 Berto Spoor as Softball Team Member (uncredited) 
 Bari K. Willerford as Softball Team Member (uncredited)

Release
The film was released in Italy on September 1, 1989

Sequel  
Indio 2: The Revolt (1991)

See also
 List of Italian films of 1989

References

External links 
 

1980s Italian-language films
English-language Italian films
1989 films
Films directed by Antonio Margheriti
Italian adventure films
1980s adventure films
Films scored by Pino Donaggio
Films set in Brazil
Films set in the Amazon
Films about Native Americans
Films about veterans
1980s Italian films